Leptodontidium elatius var. elatius is a slow growing pathanogenic ascomycete fungus responsible for Sooty Blotch disease.

References

External links 
 Index Fungorum
 USDA ARS Fungal Database

Fungal plant pathogens and diseases
Ascomycota enigmatic taxa